Tarabhusan Pal Junior College, formerly known as Karimganj Junior College of Science, established in 2003, is a major college situated in Nilmoni Road, Karimganj, Assam. This college is affiliated with the AHSEC. (Recognition No. AHSEC/RPR/RRC/60/07/1904). Class XI and XII students are taught here in Science, Arts and Commerce.

Departments

Science 
Physics
Chemistry
Mathematics
Biology
Computer Science & Application
Statistics

Commerce
Business Studies
Accountancy
Commercial Mathematics & Statistics

Arts
Bengali
English
History
Economics
Political Science
Logic & Philosophy

References

External links
https://www.kjcs2003.org/

Universities and colleges in Assam
Educational institutions established in 2003
2003 establishments in Assam